Joanna Canton (born February 14, 1978) is an American actress. She had a recurring role on That '70s Show as Nina, Fez's boss and love interest at the DMV during the show's fifth season.

Filmography

Film

Television

External links

American television actresses
American film actresses
1978 births
Living people
21st-century American women